Shawo Township is a township of Echeng District, Ezhou, Hubei, People's Republic of China, located  south of the Yangtze River and almost twice that southeast of downtown Ezhou.

Geography

Administrative divisions
, it has 11 villages under its administration. As of 2016, Shawo Township administered:

Demographics

See also 
 List of township-level divisions of Hubei

References

External links 

Township-level divisions of Hubei
Ezhou